The 1965 Nobel Prize in Literature was awarded the Russian novelist Mikhail Sholokhov (1905–1984) "for the artistic power and integrity with which, in his epic of the Don, he has given expression to a historic phase in the life of the Russian people." He is the third Russian-speaking author to become the prize's recipient.

Laureate

Mikhail Sholokhov was born in Vyoshenskaya, Russia. He fought in the Russian Civil War as a Bolshevik at the age of 13. To pursue a career as a journalist, he relocated to Moscow in 1922. He returned to his birthplace two years later and concentrated solely on his literary career. He drew inspiration for his debut book, Donskie Rasskazy ("Tales from the Don", 1925), from his experiences in both the Russian Civil War and World War I.

His magnum opus Tikhii Don ("The Quiet Don", 1928–1966) was published in four volumes (translated as And Quiet Flows the Don (1934); The Don Flows Home to the Sea (1940); Quiet Flows the Don (1966)) to him 14 years to complete. It was praised as a potent illustration of socialist realism and became the most widely-read book in Soviet literature. Sholokhov had a keen interest in how people's lives played out against Russia's changes and problems. It took him 27 years to complete his other significant piece for the Don cycle, Podnyataya Tselina ("Virgin Soil Upturned", 1932–1960).

Deliberations

Nominations
Sholokhov started receiving nominations for the Nobel Prize in Literature since 1947. He received 20 nominations in total until he was eventually awarded. He received the highest number of nominations in the year 1965.

For this year, the Nobel Committee received 120 nominations for 93 authors including Simon Vestdijk, Ramón Menéndez Pidal, Nelly Sachs (awarded in 1966), André Malraux, Ezra Pound, Pablo Neruda (awarded in 1971), E. M. Forster, Max Frisch, and Taha Hussein. 21 of the nominees were newly nominated, such as Alejo Carpentier, Konstantin Paustovsky, Mohammad-Ali Jamalzadeh, Anna Akhmatova, Marguerite Yourcenar, Gyula Illyés, Marie Luise Kaschnitz, Gilbert Cesbron, Giovannino Guareschi, and Alan Sillitoe. The highest number of nominations was for the French author André Malraux (with six nominations). Eight of the nominees were women, namely: Marguerite Yourcenar, Judith Wright, Anna Akhmatova, Katherine Anne Porter, Marie Luise Kaschnitz, Nelly Sachs, Maria Dąbrowska, and Maria Raquel Adler.

The authors Jacques Audiberti, Alejandro Casona, Thomas B. Costain, Rampo Edogawa, Eleanor Farjeon, Lorraine Hansberry, Louis Hjelmslev, Mehdi Huseyn, Shirley Jackson, Randall Jarrell, Una Marson, Betty Miller, Edgar Mittelholzer, Fan S. Noli, Dawn Powell, Arthur Schlesinger, Sr., Jack Spicer, Howard Spring, Thomas Sigismund Stribling, Paul Tillich, and Aslaug Vaa died in 1965 without having been nominated for the prize.

Prize decision
The Nobel committee of the Swedish Academy was unanimous to propose that the prize should be awarded to Mikhail Sholokhov, who had been a candidate for many years and a main candidate for the prize the previous year. The committee discussed a proposal to share the prize between Sholokhov and Anna Akhmatova, but the idea was rejected by the committees' chairman Anders Österling saying that the authors had nothing but their language in common. The committee also discussed the possibility of a shared prize to Miguel Angel Asturias and Jorge Luis Borges, and to Shmuel Yosef Agnon and Nelly Sachs respectively.

Reactions
The choice of Sholokhov was widely criticised for being politically motivated, but was celebrated by the authorities in the Soviet Union.

References

External links
 Award Ceremony speech nobelprize.org
 List of all nominations nobelprize.org

1965